Andrew Poje (born February 25, 1987) is a Canadian ice dancer. With partner Kaitlyn Weaver, he is a three-time World medalist (2014 silver, 2015 and 2018 bronze), a two-time Four Continents champion (2010, 2015), a two-time Grand Prix Final champion (2014–15, 2015–16), and a three-time Canadian national champion (2015, 2016, 2019).

Personal life 
Andrew Poje was born on February 25, 1987, in Waterloo, Ontario. His ancestry is Slovak — his mother was born in Bratislava — and Slovenian Gottscheer. He is the great-nephew of former pair skater and coach Agnesa Búřilová (née Wlachovská). He has some knowledge of French.

Career

Early career 
Poje took up ice dancing at age seven and also skated in singles until he was 13. In his early career, he competed with Alexandra Nino, with whom he is the 2001 Canadian novice silver medalist. He teamed up with Alice Graham in late spring 2004. They trained in Kitchener-Waterloo with coaches Paul MacIntosh, Rebecca Babb, Susie McGrigor, and Bernie Ford. They won the bronze medal on the junior level at the 2005 Canadian Championships and placed ninth at the senior level at the 2006 Canadian Championships.

2006–07 season: Junior World bronze 
Poje teamed up with American-born Kaitlyn Weaver in August 2006. They trained in Kitchener-Waterloo, Ontario under coach Paul MacIntosh.

Weaver/Poje competed on the 2006–07 ISU Junior Grand Prix, winning two bronze medals. They went to the 2007 Canadian Championships and won the bronze medal in their first season together. They were placed on the team to the 2007 Junior Worlds. Weaver dislocated her left shoulder in the warm-up before the original dance but was able to compete and the couple won the bronze medal. They placed twentieth at the 2007 World Championships.

2007–08 season
In the 2007–08 season, Weaver/Poje competed on the senior Grand Prix series at the 2008 Skate Canada International, where they placed 6th, and at the 2007 Trophée Eric Bompard, where they placed seventh. They won the silver medal at the 2008 Canadian Championships, placed 5th at the 2008 Four Continents, and seventeenth at the 2008 World Championships. In January 2008, they moved to Toronto to train with new coach Shae-Lynn Bourne.

2008–09 season 
In the 2008–09 season, Weaver/Poje competed on the Grand Prix series at the 2008 Cup of China, where they placed 6th, and at the 2008 NHK Trophy, where they placed 7th. They won the bronze medal at the 2009 Canadian Championships and placed fifth at the 2009 Four Continents. Weaver was granted Canadian citizenship in June 2009. Advised by Bourne that they needed a more competitive atmosphere, they switched training bases in 2009 to the Detroit Skating Club in Bloomfield Hills, Michigan, where they were coached by Pasquale Camerlengo and Anjelika Krylova. They also continued to work with Bourne. Massimo Scali, Natalia Annenko, and Elizabeth Punsalan were also members of the coaching team in Michigan.

2009–10 season: Four Continents gold 
During the 2009–10 season, Weaver/Poje won their first Grand Prix medal, bronze at 2009 Skate Canada International. They also won bronze at the 2010 Canadian Championships. They were sent to the 2010 Four Continents where they won the gold medal. They did not qualify for the Olympic or World teams.

2010–11 season 
During the 2010–11 season, Weaver/Poje won silver medals at the 2010 NHK Trophy and the 2011 Canadian Championships. They qualified for their first Grand Prix Final, where they finished 5th. They were fourth at the 2011 Four Continents. They were sent to the 2011 World Championships and placed fifth, a significant improvement over their previous best result of seventeenth at the event.

2011–12 season: Four Continents bronze 

In the 2011–12 season, Weaver/Poje chose their free dance music on the suggestion of an anonymous fan. Karl Hugo composed additional music to add greater variation to the program. Weaver/Poje competed at three Grand Prix events and won three silver medals. They took the bronze medal at 2012 Four Continents before ending their season at the 2012 World Championships, where they placed fourth.

2012–13 season 
For the 2012–13 season, Weaver/Poje decided to go in a new direction and asked a contemporary dancer, Allison Holker, to work with them on their free dance. They began their season by winning gold at the 2012 Ondrej Nepela Memorial. Weaver/Poje's Grand Prix assignments were the 2012 Skate America and 2012 Cup of China. At both events, they were second in the short and third in the free dance and won the bronze medal overall behind Russians Ekaterina Bobrova / Dmitri Soloviev.

Weaver fractured her left fibula on December 14, 2012, when she fell into the boards during training in Bloomfield Hills, Michigan, and underwent surgery on December 18 in Toronto. As a result, the duo withdrew from the 2013 Canadian Championships. Hoping to compete at Worlds, Poje continued to train in Michigan, with Krylova acting as his partner, while Weaver recovered in Toronto. In mid-February, Weaver/Poje were added to Canada's World team. They placed fifth at the 2013 World Championships in London, Ontario.

2013–14 season: Sochi Olympics and World silver 
In the 2013–14 season, Weaver/Poje won two silver medals on the Grand Prix series and placed fifth at the Grand Prix Final. After taking silver at the 2014 Canadian Championships, they were selected to represent Canada at the 2014 Winter Olympics in Sochi, where they finished seventh. At the 2014 World Championships in Saitama, Japan, Weaver/Poje placed second in the short dance and third in the free dance. Finishing 0.02 of a point behind Italy's Cappellini/Lanotte and 0.04 ahead of France's Pechalat/Bourzat, they ended the competition as silver medalists.

2014–15 season: Grand Prix Final and Four Continents gold, World bronze 
In the 2014–15 season, Weaver/Poje took gold at both of their Grand Prix assignments, the 2014 Skate Canada International and 2014 NHK Trophy. In December 2014, they won the Grand Prix Final in Barcelona, having ranked first in both segments ahead of the United States' Madison Chock / Evan Bates. In January, Weaver/Poje won their first Canadian Championship title. They again defeated Chock/Bates at the Four Continents Championships, held in Seoul in February 2015. Weaver/Poje were third in the short dance but first in the free dance, en route to their second Four Continents title. They capped off the season with a bronze medal at the 2015 World Figure Skating Championships.

2015–16 season: Second Grand Prix Final gold 
At the beginning of the 2015–16 season, Weaver/Poje placed first at the 2015 Finlandia Trophy. However, they received the feedback from the judges that their Elvis Presley medley did not have clear rhythm required for the short dance. They changed the music to a set of Johann Strauss II pieces and won the 2015 Skate Canada International three weeks later. The team went on to win the 2015 Rostelecom Cup as well as their second consecutive gold at the 2015–16 Grand Prix of Figure Skating Final.

In the second half of the 2015–16 season, Weaver/Poje won their second consecutive national title  and finished third at the 2016 Four Continents Figure Skating Championships the following month. The team capped of their season with a fifth-place finish at the 2016 World Figure Skating Championships.

2016–17 season
During the 2016–17 season, Weaver/Poje began working with Nikolai Morozov as their new coach, training in both New Jersey and Moscow, Russia. They placed second at the Cup of China and third at the 2016 Rostelecom Cup. They won the silver medal at the Canadian Championships and placed fifth at Four Continents. Weaver/Poje finished their season in fourth place at the 2017 World Figure Skating Championships.

2017–18 season: Pyeongchang Olympics and third Worlds medal 
For the 2017–18 season, Weaver/Poje returned with a free dance from the 2011–12 season, 'Je Suis Malade'. They came in second at 2017 Skate Canada and placed fourth at 2017 Inernationaux de France. The couple came in third at the 2018 Canadian Championships, behind Virtue/Moir and Gilles/Poirier. Weaver/Poje represented Canada at the 2018 Winter Olympics in Pyeongchang, placing seventh in ice dancing. At the 2018 World Figure Skating Championships, Weaver/Poje won the bronze medal after placing third in the short dance and fourth in the free dance.

2018–19 season: Four Continents silver 
For the 2018–19 season, Weaver/Poje chose for their free dance "S.O.S. d'un terrien en détresse", a song from the French musical Starmania, after seeing it used by Kazakhstani figure skater Denis Ten.  Ten was murdered in July 2018, at which point the pair came to regard the program as a tribute to their friend.  They competed at and won the 2018 CS Autumn Classic International, before planning to skip the 2018–19 Grand Prix in favour of a nationwide tour organized by Virtue and Moir.

Returning to competition for the 2019 Canadian Championships, Weaver/Poje placed first in the rhythm dance.  As one of the few senior teams who had previously competed the Tango Romantica pattern when it was a compulsory dance in the 2009–10 season, Poje commented that this was both "a benefit and a detriment" due to the changing style of judging.  They came second in the free dance, behind Gilles/Poirier, but won the gold medal overall by 1.47 points, their narrowest victory over Gilles/Poirier at Canadian Nationals.  Weaver said that, in addition to Ten, the program had been skated in tribute to their recently deceased friend, American pairs skater John Coughlin.

At the 2019 Four Continents Championships, Weaver/Poje placed third in the rhythm dance, behind Madison Hubbell / Zachary Donohue and Chock/Bates.  In the free dance, they again ranked third, behind Chock/Bates and Gilles/Poirier, with Hubbell/Donohue falling into fourth place due to a major error on their stationary lift.  Weaver/Poje won the silver medal overall.

Weaver/Poje next competed at the 2019 World Championships. They came in fifth place in both segments, scoring a personal best of 82.84 points in the rhythm dance, only 0.26 points out of third. They then scored 122.78 points in the free dance, scoring 205.62 points in total and coming in fifth overall.  They concluded their season at the 2019 World Team Trophy, representing Team Canada. They scored 79.60 points in the rhythm dance and a new personal best of 124.18 points in the free dance, while Team Canada finished fifth overall.

2019–20 season 
On June 19, 2019, Weaver and Poje announced that they would not compete in the Grand Prix that autumn, and that they were going to evaluate their future plans.

Post-competitive career 
Following his retirement from competition, Poje continued to perform with Stars on Ice. He appeared on two seasons of the CBC competition program Battle of the Blades, finishing in second place in the fifth season partnered with Natalie Spooner, and later being eliminated in the second round of the sixth season partnered with Meghan Agosta.

In August of 2021, it was announced that he would be joining the coaching staff of the Kelowna Skating Club in Kelowna, British Columbia.

Programs

With Weaver

Competitive highlights 
GP: Grand Prix; CS: Challenger Series; JGP: Junior Grand Prix

With Weaver

With Nino

Detailed results

With Weaver

 CD = Compulsory dance; OD = Original dance; FD = Free dance.
 SD = Short dance.

References

External links 

 
 Kaitlyn Weaver / Andrew Poje at Skate Canada
 Kaitlyn Weaver & Andrew Poje's official site

1987 births
Living people
Canadian male ice dancers
Skating people from Ontario
Sportspeople from Kitchener, Ontario
Canadian people of Slovak descent
Canadian people of German descent
Olympic figure skaters of Canada
Figure skaters at the 2014 Winter Olympics
Figure skaters at the 2018 Winter Olympics
Four Continents Figure Skating Championships medalists
World Junior Figure Skating Championships medalists
Season-end world number one figure skaters
World Figure Skating Championships medalists
21st-century Canadian people